Cypraecassis is a genus of medium-sized to large sea snails, marine gastropod molluscs in the family Cassidae.

Fossil record
Fossils of Cypraecassis are found in marine strata from the Miocene until the Quaternary (age range: from 15.97 to 0.012 million years ago.).  Fossils are known from various localities in Europe, Central America and India.

Species
Species within the genus Cypraecassis include:
 Cypraecassis coarctata (Sowerby, 1825) 
 Cypraecassis rufa (Linnaeus, 1758)
 Cypraecassis tenuis (Wood, 1828)
 Cypraecassis testiculus (Linnaeus, 1758) 
 Cypraecassis testiculus senegalica Cypraecassis wilmae Kreipl & Alf, 2000

References

 Rolán E., 2005. Malacological Fauna From The Cape Verde Archipelago. Part 1, Polyplacophora and Gastropoda.'' 
 WoRMS info here:

External links
 Natural History Rotterdam images of the family: 

Cassidae